A rat is a rodent of the genus Rattus. Colloquially, rat may refer to a muskrat (Ondatra zibethicus), a medium-sized semiaquatic rodent native to North America.

Rat, RAT, or Rats may also refer to:

Places
 Rat, Novi Travnik, a village in Bosnia and Herzegovina
 Rat, Missouri, an unincorporated community
 Rat Island (disambiguation)
 Rat Islands, Alaska, United States
 Rat Lake (Aitkin County, Minnesota), United States
 Rat Lake (Cottonwood County, Minnesota), United States
 Rat Portage, the former name of Kenora, Ontario, Canada
 Rat River (disambiguation)

People
 Rat (Ned's Atomic Dustbin), a band member of Ned's Atomic Dustbin
 Rats (footballer) (born 1977), nickname of former Angolan footballer Ambrósio Pascoal
 Blek le Rat (born 1952), French graffiti artist
 Răzvan Raț (born 1981), Romanian footballer
 Vasiliy Rats (born 1961), Ukrainian footballer

Technology

Computing

 Radio access technology
 RATS (software), regression analysis of time series
 Remote access trojan, malware

Other
 De Rat, IJlst, a windmill
 Ram air turbine
 Rock Abrasion Tool, on Mars rovers
 CL-70 RAT (Remote Articulated Track), Canadair vehicle
 Rocket Assisted Torpedo, later named RUR-5 ASROC
 Rapid antigen test, RAT

Arts and entertainment

Characters
 Rat (Pearls Before Swine), in comic strip
 Rat Rathbone, in Robert Muchamore's CHERUB series
 Theodore Donald "Rat" Finch, computer hacker in The Core
 Tunnel Rat (G.I. Joe)

Films
 Rat (film), a 2000 Irish film
 Rats (2016 film), a 2016 American documentary horror film
 Rat, a 1998 documentary by Mark Lewis
 Rats: Night of Terror, a 1984 Italian film

Music
 Rats (album), 1994, by Sass Jordan
 "Rats" (Pearl Jam song), from 1993 album Vs.
 "Rats" (The Kinks song), 1970
 "Rats", a song from the album Not Accepted Anywhere by The Automatics
 "Rats" (Ghost song), 2018

Other
 "Rat" (short story), by James Patrick Kelly
 "Rats", an episode of The Protector
 Rats!, a 1998 2D platform video game

Other uses
 Rat (zodiac), sign of the Chinese zodiac
 Rat or shoulder tender, a cut of beef
 Rat, slang for what an informant does
 Rat, a device for forming a hair bun
 Pro Co RAT, a guitar distortion pedal
 Rat (newspaper), New York City, US
 Remote Associates Test of creativity potential

See also

 
 
 
 The Rat (disambiguation)
 The Rats (disambiguation)
 Rât (disambiguation)
 RAT test (disambiguation)
 Raat (disambiguation)
 Ratt (disambiguation)
 RRAT, rotating radio transients
 Lab rat (disambiguation)